Alice Wright (born 1994) is a British runner.

Alice Wright may also refer to:

Alice Buck Norwood Spearman Wright (1902–1989), American activist
Alice Morgan Wright (1881–1975), American sculptor